Angélique-Marie Élisabeth Émilie de Matignon, née Le Tonnelier de Breteuil, married Countesse Goyon de Matignon and known in history as Madame de Matignon (14 March 1757 Paris - 14 May 1833 Paris), was a prominent fashion figure during the French Ancien Régime, known for her extravagant hairdressing expenses.

Life
Her father was Louis Charles Auguste Le Tonnellier, Baron de Breteuil, French diplomate and politician (1730 Azay-le-Ferron - 1807 Paris), and her mother was Philiberte Jerôme de Parat de Montgeron, daughter of a wealthy financier (October 1737 Paris - 13/14 March 1765/1786). They were married on 24 January 1752. Some Internet sources give her year of birth as 1740 and the year of the marriage as 1768, possibly due to a mix up to another person of a similar name.

Her mother Philiberte de Parat de Montgeron died on 13 or 14 March 1765 or 1786, the place and the time of death are uncertain. Some sources say she died in Stockholm, Sweden in 1765, possibly of childbirth, but her husband Baron de Breteuil was accredited as the French ambassador in Sweden four years later in 1769 at the earliest.

Angélique-Marie Élisabeth Émilie de Matignon was married with Count Louis Charles Auguste Goyon de Matignon, Count de Gacé (22 April 1755 Paris - 18 December 1773 Naples) in 1772. He was the last male descendant of the maréchaux de Goyon de Matignon. She was widowed at the age of 16, when her husband died in Naples on 18 December 1773 at the age of 18. Their daughter Anne Louise Caroline was born in Naples the following year, on 3 May or 3 July 1774. In 1773 her father Baron de Breteuil was the French ambassador in Naples.  Anne Louise Caroline, née de Goyon de Matignon, Countesse de Gacé (3 May/July 1774 Naples – 23 March 1846 Paris) married 1788 Anne-Charles Francois, Duke de Montmorency (1768–1846).

After the French Revolution in 1789, Matignon fled with her father and her lover Bishop of Pamiers (1747–1824) to Switzerland and Hamburg, Germany. They returned to France in 1802.

Fashion and extravagancy
Matignon was known for her sophisticated outfits ("Elle est d'une élégance achevée") and was a client of the famous fashion designer Rose Bertin. However, when returning to Paris from Naples in 1777, she ignored totally the new fashion of padded false bottom supporting the skirts e.g. Cul de Paris also known as culs postiches which was à la mode from c. 1773 to the 1780s.
It is known that she paid her tailor 600 livres for one dress. The price for a very elaborate dress could be as high as 10,000 livres.

She gave her hairdresser, fashion merchant Le sieur Beaulard, also known in some sources mistakenly as Baulard, 24 000 livres (e.g. pounds in silver) a year for styling her hair in a different way every day of the year. 

The value corresponds in 2014 euros some 1,2 million €.

Considering the enormous amount of money paid, it is not known whether this applied for styling her own hair or her wigs or both. Also it is not known how many employees Beaulard had in his shop. It is known that besides Rose Bertin, Le sieur Beaulard was among the following three top fashion merchants alongside Madame Eloffe and Mademoiselle Alexandre in the 1770s. Beaulard was praised as "a modiste without parallel, the creator and the poet ... because of his myriad inventions and delicious names for fripperies". As the coiffures got very high during the 1770s, Beaulard invented the coiffure à la grand-mére, a mechanical coiffure which could be lowered as much as one foot (30 cm) by touching a spring.

However, the King of the Parisian hairdressing was Léonard Autié, who was Queen Marie Antoinette's favourite coiffeur. The Queen also used the services of Beaulard, which caused rivalry with Queen's favourite fashion merchant Rose Bertin.

Styling and making huge and elaborate coiffures was labour-intensive and costly business. A chignon wig made to the opera singer Antoinette Saint-Huberty (Saint-Huberti) cost 232 livres.
A coiffure was usually put together with clients own hair as a base, including metal wire and padded cushion supports, false hair (postiches), wheat starch, pomade made of lard and ornaments like flowers, feathers, jewelry, ribbons, gauze, lace and sometimes even with little objects like miniature ships. The number of wigs owned by Countess de Matignon is not known. 
One of her hairstyles is known to be called à la Jardinière (Gardener Style), adorned with an artichoke and broccoli sprouts.

The information known for the price of a (gentleman's) wig or perruque, varied from 12 livres for the cheapest one, to 35 livres for the most expensive one. It has been estimated that in the 1200 wig making and hairdressing shops worked some 10 000 employees or journeymen (garçons), usually 15 hours a day. In the 1780s there were some 900 master wig makers in Paris.

References

18th-century French people
19th-century French people
1757 births
1833 deaths